Oakton Gables is a historic apartment building at the southeast corner of Oakton Street and Ridge Avenue in Evanston, Illinois. The three-story brick building was built in 1927. Architect Godfrey E. Larson designed the Tudor Revival building. The building's design includes limestone trim and window hoods, a raised central courtyard, and gables projecting above the roofline, some of which are half-timbered. The design's use of copper is particularly distinctive; the courtyard entrance has copper-clad towers on either side, and it is also used for downspouts and flashing.

The building was added to the National Register of Historic Places on March 15, 1984.

References

External links

Buildings and structures on the National Register of Historic Places in Cook County, Illinois
Residential buildings on the National Register of Historic Places in Illinois
Buildings and structures in Evanston, Illinois
Apartment buildings in Illinois
Tudor Revival architecture in Illinois
Residential buildings completed in 1927